The Postal Services Act 2000 (c.26) is an Act of the Parliament of the United Kingdom, relating to the postal industry. It established an industry regulator, Postcomm (s.1), a consumer watchdog, Postwatch (s.2), required a "universal service" of post to be provided (ss.3-4) and set up rules for licensing postal services operators (ss.6-41). It also converted the public branch of the postal industry, the Post Office, from a statutory corporation to a public limited company, wholly owned by the government.

Background

Second Reading of the Bill, and debate, introduced by Secretary of State for Trade and Industry, Stephen Byers.

Parliamentary Undersecretary Alan Johnson summed up the Bill before the vote.

Liberalisation
The Postal Services Regulations 1999 (SI 1999/2107)

The Postal Services (EC Directive) Regulations 2002 (
SI 2002/3050), r.8

s.11 Allows PostComm to grant licences that would otherwise contravene s.6(1), the general prohibition on conveying a letter from one place to another. s.7 (amended by the 2002 Regulations) stated that s.6(1) would not be contravened by carrying letters under £1 value.

Regulations

Postal Services Act 2000 (Commencement No. 5) Order 2007 S.I. 2007/1181

Postal Packets (Revenue and Customs) Regulations 2007 S.I. 2007/2195

See also
UK competition law
Public Service law in the UK
Postal Services Act 2011

References

United Kingdom Acts of Parliament 2000
Postal system of the United Kingdom
Royal Mail